Balaknama is an Indian newspaper which is run by children .

Based out of Delhi's slums, Balaknama is completely staffed by children who live and work on the streets. The sixteen-page editorial publishes stories and reports based on the lives of street children. It explores issues like sexual abuse, child labour, police brutality, and also covers feel-good stories. Launched in 2003 with just few reporters, its network has spread to seven cities across India, with over 10,000 children working for the publication.

It is edited by volunteers of Chetna, an NGO which works with street and working children. In 2014, the circulation of the paper went up to 5,500 units. The newspaper has 14 regular reporters in Delhi itself and many others in Uttar Pradesh, Madhya Pradesh, and Haryana. Children who cannot write contribute by dictating their stories to other reporters. In 2015, India Today called Balaknama the "world's unique newspaper for and by street and working children".

In November 2013, Balaknama's story was made into a TV documentary titled Slumkid Reporters.

References

2003 establishments in Delhi
Hindi-language newspapers
Newspapers published in Delhi
Publications established in 2003